Simon Skrabb (born 19 January 1995) is a Finnish footballer who plays for Swedish Allsvenskan side Kalmar FF and the Finland national team.

Club career

Jaro

On 12 May 2011, he became the youngest player to score a goal in a Veikkausliiga match.

Skrabb is also noted for having scored a scorpion kick in an away match against Gefle IF while playing for Åtvidaberg in the 2015 Allsvenskan. In spite of this, Skrabb's team were relegated from the Swedish top flight at the end of the season after finishing bottom of the table.

IFK Norrköping

On 9 December 2016 it was reported that Skrabb had signed a four-year contract with IFK Norrköping.

Brescia

On 13 January 2020, he signed a 3.5-year contract with Italian club Brescia.

Kalmar

On 26 January 2022, Skrabb signed with Kalmar FF in Sweden for the 2022 season.

International career

He made his debut for the Finland national team on 10 January 2016 in a friendly match in Abu Dhabi against Sweden when he entered the game as a substitute for Roope Riski.

Career statistics

Club

References
  Profile at veikkausliiga.com

External links 

 Kalmar FF official profile
 Simon Skrabb – SPL competition record
 
  

1995 births
Living people
People from Jakobstad
Association football midfielders
Finnish footballers
Finland international footballers
Finland under-21 international footballers
Finland youth international footballers
FF Jaro players
Veikkausliiga players
Åtvidabergs FF players
Gefle IF players
IFK Norrköping players
Brescia Calcio players
Kalmar FF players
Allsvenskan players
Serie B players
Finnish expatriate footballers
Expatriate footballers in Sweden
Finnish expatriate sportspeople in Sweden
Expatriate footballers in Italy
Finnish expatriate sportspeople in Italy
Sportspeople from Ostrobothnia (region)